Elizabeth Cullen Dunn (born 1968) is an American political anthropologist and geographer.  Her work focuses on responses to catastrophic social change, particularly in the post-Soviet world.

Education
Dunn holds a Ph.D. in anthropology from Johns Hopkins University (1998).

Scholarship
Dunn's work investigates governance, the state, and the ways in which these processes strive to produce governable subjects. She investigates these topics by examining the ways they are manifest in people's lived experiences. Though all Dunn's work deals with these topics, thematically, it can be divided into three bodies of literature: on foreign direct investment (FDI) in Poland and the former Eastern Bloc more broadly; on global food safety regulation; and, most recently, on forced migration.

Career
In 2000, Dunn accepted a joint appointment in the Department of Geography and the Program in International Affairs at the University of Colorado in Boulder, CO. In 2014, Dunn moved to the Departments of Geography and International Studies at Indiana University, Bloomington, later becoming Professor.

Fellowships:  
 Fellowship at the Wissenschaftskolleg zu Berlin from 1999 to 2000
 Fellow at Yale University’s Center for Agrarian Studies, 2006
 Copenhagen University’s Department of Comparative Cultural and Regional Studies, 2015.

Selected publications
 Dunn, E. (2004) Privatizing Poland: Baby Food, Big Business, and the Remaking of Labor.  Ithaca: Cornell University Press.  (In Polish translation, Prywatyzujac Polske, 2008, Warsaw: Krytyka Polityczna).

References

1968 births
American anthropologists
American geographers
Johns Hopkins University alumni
Living people